Iris Balbina Fontbona González (born 1942/1943) is a Chilean mining magnate, media proprietor, billionaire businesswoman, the widow of Andrónico Luksic Abaroa, from whom she inherited Antofagasta PLC. She is the wealthiest person in Chile, the third wealthiest in Latin America, and the ninth wealthiest woman worldwide in 2022 according to Forbes.

Fortune
Fontbona acquired her wealth following the death of her husband, Andrónico Luksic Abaroa, in 2005 from cancer.

The bulk of her husband's business went to their three sons, Guillermo, Jean Paul and Andrónico. Jean Paul manages Antofagasta, Luksic Group's copper mining group and one of the largest mining companies in the world.

Business
Fontbona and her family control Antofagasta, the Santiago-based mining company. Through the publicly-traded company Quiñenco, they control Banco de Chile, Madeco, a copper products manufacturer, the country's largest brewer, CCU, and a shipping company, CSAV. CSAV is the world's 16th largest shipping company as measured by TEUs. In 2013, she controlled 65% of Antofagasta.

Following the death of her husband, business of her husband under her control, "Fontbona managed to make their family business grow and reach its new heights of success".

This included turning the business in the second biggest bank in Chile, the biggest brewer in the world, manager of the largest copper mines in the world and controlling the world's largest shipping company. Another one of her businesses is a pair of luxury hotel chains and a luxury resort in Croatia.  One of her first major actions following her husband's death was to acquire a 70% stake in Chilean television station, Canal 13. Much of her power in the company appears to be indirect. Major business decisions impacting the company largely run by her son, Andrónico Luksic Craig, need to be approved of by Fontbona.

Philanthropy
In 2015, Fontbona donated a record CL$3.1 billion (approximately US$3.9 million) to the annual Chilean Telethon, which seeks to help children with physical disabilities. She appeared on television for a telethon, which also takes place before a live audience.

In 2016, she donated CL$4.4 billion (approximately US$5.5 million), which assisted in setting a record for the charity event in terms of funds raised.

Background
Fontbona was born in 1942 and attended a Catholic high school. When she was 17 she met Andrónico Luksic Abaroa, who was 15 years older than her, and who married him by the time she was 20. Luksic had five children by his first wife, Patricia Lederer, who died before he did. Fontbona became the step-mother of Andrónico Luksic Craig when he was a 7-year-old. Another of her sons was Guillermo Luksic, who died of lung cancer in 2013.  The couple had three children of their own.

Fontbona spends time in three primary residences, including Vitacura, Santiago, Chile, Belgravia in London, and Liechtenstein. She is a devout Roman Catholic. She keeps a low profile but garners much media attention annually during the Chilean Telethon. She does not grant interviews.

References

1940s births
Date of birth missing (living people)
Living people
Chilean businesspeople in mining
Chilean billionaires
Female billionaires
People from Santiago
Women in mining
Mass media owners in Latin America